= Hania Mufti =

Jordanian human rights investigator

Hania Mufti is a Jordanian national who has long lived in London and who used to direct the Middle Eastern branch of Human Rights Watch. She was listed as one of the 100 most influential people in 2005 by Time magazine.

She previously worked for Amnesty International, where she was in charge of their investigations into human rights abuses in Iraq. The evidence gathered by her team was key in the citation of human rights as a cause for the 2003 Iraq War and the toppling of Saddam Hussein. Between 2007 and 2008, she served as the United Nations chief of the Human Rights Office with the United Nations Assistance Mission for Iraq.

Since the war, she has continued to investigate human rights standards maintained by the troops in Iraq, during the occupation of the country. She also gathers evidence for the trials of Iraq's former leaders.
